Charles Page High School is a high school in Sand Springs, Oklahoma, United States, named after the philanthropist Charles Page. It is the only public high school in Sand Springs.

History
Charles Page High School was built in 1959, constructed to replace Sand Springs High School, which is now the former Central Ninth Grade Center/Virtual Center.

On August 21, 1964, five black students were refused enrollment at Charles Page which was at that time an all-white high school.

In March 2019, voters passed a general obligation bond measure to fund a new Ninth Grade Center add-on at the CPHS campus. It replaced the former Central Ninth Grade Center in downtown Sand Springs. The building of the Charles Page High School Freshman Academy was completed in the summertime before the schools first semester that year.

Gay-Straight Alliance controversy
In 2004, Charles Page High School garnered national attention with a controversy surrounding the creation of a Gay-Straight Alliance at the school. An openly gay student, Michael Shackelford, was the focus of a series of articles in The Washington Post which brought national attention to the school. This national attention caught the eye of radical preacher Fred Phelps of Topeka, Kansas Westboro Baptist Church who came and protested at Charles Page in November 2004. However, the alliance was briefly dismantled after those students graduated. It has since been reformed, but was renamed to “Gender-Sexuality Alliance” years later.

Extra-curricular activities 
Clubs include the African American Student Union (AASU), Native American Student Association (NASA), Anchor Club, French Club, Spanish Club, Key Club, YMCA Youth and Government, Student Council, Gold Pride Marching Band, Jazz Band, Academic Team, Family Career Community Leaders of America, Future Farmers of America, Choir, Debate, Competitive Speech, BITI, Business Professionals of America, National Honor Society, Drama, Gender Sexuality Alliance, The Sandite (yearbook committee), and The Sandtonian, an online newspaper that had formerly run for over 100 years in its nondigital form prior to the launch of the website. Additionally, there is a Bible Study at Charles Page, but it is not an official club.

Athletics

The school mascot is the Minuteman.

''V = Varsity, JV = Junior Varsity

State championships 
 1966: Football-Class 3A
 1971: Wrestling 4A
 1994: Girls' Basketball-Class 6A
 2012: Wrestling- 6A Academic
 2015: 9th Grade/JV Cheerleading, 8th Grade Cheerleading
 2017: Wrestling Dual and Team-Class 6A

Football history

Charles Prigmore was the first head coach at Charles Page High School.

Travis Rhodes took up the reins from 1961 to 1962 and led Charles Page to an undefeated season in 1962, but they were unable to compete in the playoffs because they weren't in an eligible conference.

Frank Tillery coached from 1964 to 1966 and in 1966 led them to their first and only state title in Class 2A. Quarterback Jackie Hill took them 12-0 and also landed a district title. On October 21, they upset the #1 ranked Broken Arrow and earned the #1 spot for themselves. They settled their 1951 score against Ada with a 37–26 win, then confronted El Reno in the final round. The game was played at Taft Stadium in Oklahoma City on an icy field in December. It was so cold that day that the cheerleaders and fans were burning fires in trashcans for warmth. At one point, football player Arlie Christmas accidentally set his leg on fire, briefly, without injury. David Treadwell, however, was not without injury and left the game with a broken arm. The Sandites won the game 14–7. A road through the Charles Page campus was named after Frank Tillery.

AD James (1976-1979) gave Charles Page her first back to back district titles in 76 and 77.

Page's longest tenured coach is LD Bains who coached from 1983 to 1996. In 1987, the Sandites shared a district title with Stillwater and Bartlesville and ended 10-3 after defeating Memorial and Norman in the playoffs before falling 14–10 to Lawton in the third round. The took another run at the championship in 1990 and entered the playoffs 7-3 after an impressive season including three shutouts, one of which was against sixth-ranked Stillwater. They defeated #10 Union and #9 Jenks before falling to Putnam North in the third round of the playoffs, finishing the season ranked fifth. The Sandites made four more playoff appearances under Bains but never made it past the first round.

In 1997, LD Bains retired and Archie Loehr took over, leading the Sandites to a perfect regular season with a district title, a victory over #2 Stillwater, and three shutouts. They scored playoff wins against #7 Broken Arrow and #11 Sapulpa before falling 10–7 against Yukon, their only defeat of the season.

The Sandites then entered a dark spell, going 3-7 under Mark Baetz in 2001, then 0-10 two consecutive seasons under Tim Beacham. In 2004, head coach Brad Odom broke the 28th game losing streak with a 58–6 win over Central.

The Sandites posted four consecutive 4–6 seasons from 2004 to 2007. In 2007, much was expected from the Sandites. Current head coach Dustin Kinard took over and Sophomore Quarterback Johnny Deaton took the helm. 2007 was also the first season in the newly remodeled Memorial Stadium. Deaton was covered as one of the top QBs in the state, despite the team only going 4–6. In 2008, the Sandites made the playoffs for the first time in 10 years and went 6-4 before losing to Union in the playoffs. The Sandites had their highest scoring season of all time, averaging 35.81 points per game under Deaton, but a terrible defense that allowed 36 points per game negated any real chance the team had at a state title. 2009 was expected to be Charles Page's year, but Deaton broke his collarbone in the opening game and missed half the season. That and a game that was won on the field but forfeited due to an ineligible player led to a disappointing 4–6 season. Deaton went on to Oklahoma State University on a scholarship and was the backup Quarterback before transferring to Northeastern State University where he started.

In 2012, star Quarterback Cody Hale led the Sandites to their winningest season in 15 years with an 8–2 record. The Sandites lost in the first round of the playoffs to Broken Arrow. Hale returned to the starting position his Senior year and led the Sandites to a 6–4 season. The Sandites hosted Westmoore at home and lost 31–10. The Tulsa World ranked Cody Hale as the best QB in the area. Hale also pitched for the Sandites and was clocked at 94 MPH during a spring baseball trip to Arizona. He was also selected for the All-State football team.

In 2014, the OSSAA split class 6A into two divisions, each with their own playoffs and state title. The Sandites fell into the smaller, new, Class 6A-II. The Sandites entered the season with high hopes at a shot for a district or state title now that they wouldn't have to go up against The Big Four. The regular season left the Sandites with a 7–3 record with two shutouts and a 63–6 win against Nathan Hale which tied for their second-highest scoring game of all time. With District losses to Booker T Washington and Bixby, the Sandites came in third in the district and qualified for the playoffs for the third-straight year. A 28-17 OT win at Midwest City sent Sand Springs to the semi-finals for the first time since 1997 where they lost 41–14 to Bixby.

In 2015, the Sandites won two of their non-district season-openers just to forfeit them due to playing an ineligible transfer student. Their third game was canceled at half time due to lightning after having already been postponed two hours. They were leading Guthrie 18–6 at the time it was called off. Sand Springs registered only two true losses in the regular season, to Bartlesville and Booker T Washington in very close games. In the quarterfinals Sand Springs dominated Stillwater, where Trace Fleischman had 3 touchdowns 2 receiving a one rushing with a 49-14 win. Sand springs narrowly upset undefeated #1 Booker T Washington in the semi-finals 23-30 for their first Championship appearance since 1966. This time, Bixby won the rematch and defended its state title. Sand springs beat the Spartans just a few weeks before at home in a 21-0 shut out, led by middle linebacker Jacob taber.

Athletic complex

Charles Page High School has an extensive athletic complex that includes tennis courts, an indoor basketball arena, a baseball field, a football stadium, and one and a half football practice fields.

At the end of the 2006 football season, Charles Page's football stadium, Memorial Stadium, was demolished. Construction of the new Memorial Stadium started in the early winter of 2007. The field itself and bleachers were completed for the start of the 2007 football season, while the stadium facilities such as restrooms, locker rooms, and concession stands were completed midseason. The original stadium was built in 1948–1949 to replace the older Dubie Field that was located at 2nd and Washington in Sand Springs.

On October 13, 2009, Sand Springs citizens passed a bond issue that will provide renovations to the current Ed Dubie fieldhouse as well as various other projects such as a new fine arts facility and the demolition of the pool for the eventual converting into a new wrestling facility.

On March 15, 2019, Sand Springs citizens passed a bond measure that will provide for the re-grading of the Sandite Softball and Baseball fields, as well new turf at Memorial Stadium and sound system upgrades at the Ed Dubie Field House.

Notable alumni
 Amanda Frances McKinney, author and entrepreneur 
Daton Fix, World Wrestling level wrestler 
 Sam Harris, singer
 Marques Haynes, professional basketball player
 William R. Pogue, astronaut
 Jerry Adair, professional baseball player
 Mae Young, professional wrestler
 Brett Sinkbeil, professional baseball player
 Michael Bowie, professional football player
 Scott L. Palk, U.S. District Judge for the United States District Court for the Western District of Oklahoma

Notes

References

External links
Sand Springs School District
Sand Springs Athletics
Gold Pride Marching Band

Public high schools in Oklahoma
Schools in Tulsa County, Oklahoma
1959 establishments in Oklahoma